Jeremy Carson, also known as Jeremy Guns, is an American hard rock bassist.

Between 2006 and 2011 he was a member of L.A. Guns (formerly the Tracii Guns Group), guitarist Tracii Guns.

Tracii Guns jokingly referred to Jeremy as his son, stating "He's not my blood son. There's a funny story behind why I actually call him my son – the guy that produced the first Brides Of Destruction record would go to The Rainbow (Bar and Grill) and say, 'This is Tracii Guns' son, this is Jeremy Guns.' And those aren't exactly the people you'd want to bullshit, if you know what I mean. So it became this thing [of] 'Jeremy, you're now my son. In case anyone ever asks and if they find out you're not there could be trouble.' But I met Jeremy during the Brides Of Destruction time, he was friends with Nikki Sixx. He was a lot younger, he was about 18 or 19 years old and he just had this glint in his eyes." Despite this, several media outlets had reported Jeremy was in fact Tracii's son.

Jeremy Guns was also the touring bassist in Brides of Destruction.

Discography

References

L.A. Guns members
American rock bass guitarists
Living people
American male bass guitarists
1983 births
21st-century American bass guitarists
21st-century American male musicians